Los Antiguos is a town in Santa Cruz Province, Argentina, located on the south shore of Lago Buenos Aires.  It lies 2 km from the border with Chile, and 8 km from the Chilean town of Chile Chico.  It is connected to Perito Moreno and Caleta Olivia on the Atlantic coast by a paved road.

The town is an agricultural oasis, where small farms produce fruit crops.  It was founded as the Leandro Alem Agricultural Colony in 1921, and was formally designated as a municipality in 1970. The area was covered by dust from the 1991 eruption of Mount Hudson, but it has since recovered.

The name of Los Antiguos is a translation of the Tehuelche name, I-Keu-khon, meaning "Place of the Elders."

In the 2010 census the town had a population of 3,363.

Climate
Los Antiguos has a cold semi-arid climate (Köppen climate classification BSk) with warm, sunny summers and cold, snowy winters.

References

External links
Los Antiguos website (in Spanish)
Lonely Planet
Diarios de Los Antiguos

Populated places in Santa Cruz Province, Argentina
Populated places established in 1921
Los Antiguos
Cities in Argentina
Argentina
Santa Cruz Province, Argentina